Bakary Moussa N'Diaye (born 26 November 1998) is a Mauritanian professional footballer who plays as a central defender or a right back for Greek Super League 2 club Rodos and the Mauritania national team.

Club career
Born in Nouakchott, N'Diaye joined Botola Pro side Difaâ Hassani El Jadidi in 2017, from hometown side FC Tevragh-Zeina. He left the club in September 2020 when his contract expired, choosing to sign for a European club instead.

On 17 January 2021, N'Diaye signed a contract with Spanish Segunda División side CD Lugo for the remainder of the season. After only appearing with the farm team in Tercera División, he moved to Greek club Rodos FC on 8 August 2021.

International career
N'Diaye made his full international debut for Mauritania on 28 May 2016, coming on as a late substitute for Mamadou Niass in a 2–0 friendly win against Gabon. On 21 May 2019, he was named in Mauritania's 23-man squad for the 2019 Africa Cup of Nations in Egypt.

N'Diaye scored his first international goal on 11 November 2020, netting the opener in a 1–1 home draw against Burundi, for the 2021 Africa Cup of Nations qualifiers.

International goals
Scores and results list Mauritania's goal tally first.

Honours
Tevragh-Zeina
Ligue 1 Mauritania: 2014–15, 2015–16

References

External links

1998 births
Living people
People from Nouakchott
Mauritanian footballers
Association football defenders
FC Tevragh-Zeina players
Botola players
Difaâ Hassani El Jadidi players
Polvorín FC players
Rodos F.C. players
Tercera División players
2019 Africa Cup of Nations players
Mauritania international footballers
Mauritanian expatriate footballers
Expatriate footballers in Morocco
Expatriate footballers in Spain
Expatriate footballers in Greece
Mauritanian expatriate sportspeople in Morocco
Mauritanian expatriate sportspeople in Spain
Mauritanian expatriate sportspeople in Greece